(December 9, 1926 – March 16, 1975) was a Japanese film director. He directed films from the 1950s to the 1970s.

Filmography

Film director 
He directed 30 films:
 Yogoreta Nikutai Seijo (汚れた肉体聖女 ) (1958)
 Otoko no chosen (1968)
 Kigeki meoto zenzai (1968)
 Worship of the Flesh (Ensetsu meiji jakyoden) (1968)

Screenwriter 
He was screenwriter of 7 films:
 Yojaso no maō (1957)

References

External links

Japanese film directors
1926 births
1975 deaths